"Waiting in Vain" is a song written by reggae musician Bob Marley and recorded by Bob Marley & The Wailers, for his 1977 album Exodus.  Released as a single, it hit number twenty-seven in the UK Singles Chart.

The single was one of only a few of Marley's Island singles to feature a non-album B-Side, this being the song "Roots", an outtake from the Rastaman Vibration sessions. This later appeared on the compilation Rebel Music and on Exodus (Deluxe Edition). The 1981 reissue of Waiting in Vain featured a megamix called Marley Mix Up Medley instead.

A rare 19-minute long acoustic version is available on YouTube.

Certifications

Lee Ritenour version 
In 1993, American Jazz guitarist Lee Ritenour recorded his version of the song featuring British reggae artist Maxi Priest. It was also included on his 21st album Wes Bound. The single peaked at number 54 in the US R&B chart.

Annie Lennox version
"Waiting in Vain" was recorded by Annie Lennox for her album Medusa in 1995 – 18 years after Marley recorded it. It was released as the album's third single in 1995 and reached number thirty-one on the UK Singles Chart. Lennox's version was used in the 2001 film Serendipity, the 2002 film Changing Lanes, the 2003 film In The Cut, and the final episode of Peter Kay's Car Share in 2018.

Track listing

Charts

References

Bob Marley songs
Annie Lennox songs
1977 singles
1995 singles
Songs written by Bob Marley
1977 songs
Island Records singles
Arista Records singles
Song recordings produced by Stephen Lipson